Demecarium bromide, trade name Humorsol, is a carbamate parasympathomimetic drug that acts as an acetylcholinesterase inhibitor, and is used as a glaucoma medication. It is applied directly to the eye in order to reduce elevated intraocular pressure associated with glaucoma.

Demecarium causes constriction of the pupil (miosis), which improves the drainage of the fluid in the eye (aqueous humour). As demecarium reversibly inhibits cholinesterase, it can be administered less frequently than other parasympathomimetic drugs, such as carbachol.

Commercially produced demecarium bromide solution, previously sold under the trade name Humorsol, is no longer available, although solutions of demecarium can be compounded.

Use in dogs
When administered with a topical corticosteroid, demecarium can delay the onset of primary glaucoma in dogs. High doses of demecarium may cause organophosphate toxicity, particularly if flea treatments containing organophosphates are administered at the same time.

See also 
 Diisopropyl fluorophosphate

References 

Acetylcholinesterase inhibitors
Bromides
Biscarbamates
Ophthalmology drugs
Quaternary ammonium compounds
Veterinary drugs
Bisquaternary anticholinesterases
Aromatic carbamates
Phenol esters